Astana Baba is the name of two eponymous mausoleums, both in Central Asia:

 Ak Astana-Baba in Sariosiyo District, Uzbekistan
 Astana Baba in Lebap Province, Turkmenistan